Anton Gosswin, also Jusswein, Jussonius, Cossiono, Gossovino, Josquinus (prob. Liege  – Freising, Liege or Bonn between 2 June 1597 and 28 October 1598), was a Flemish composer.

Life
He is documented as a singer at Munich Court in 1568, he was then appointed court Kapellmeister at Landshut in 1569 to return to Munich in 1570, as organist at the Peterskirche in 1577.  In 1580 he became Kapellmeister to the Bishop of Freising.

Works

Sacred
Cantiones, 4vv (Nuremberg, 1581); lost
Cantiones sacrae, 5, 6vv (Nuremberg, 1583); lost
Ad te levavi oculos meos, 6vv, 1583
Laetatus sum, 6vv, 1583
Missa a cappella, 4vv
Missa super ‘Cognovi Domine’, 4vv
Missa ferialis, 5vv
Missa super ‘Le mois de mai’
Missa super ‘Missus est angelus’, 5vv
Missa super ‘Vrai Dieu, disait’, 4vv
1 other mass
In te Domine speravi, 3vv
Iste est Johannes, 5vv, lost

Secular
Newe teutsche Lieder … welche gantz lieblich zu singen, auch auff allerley Instrumenten zu gebrauchen, 3vv (Nuremberg, 1581)
Madrigali, 5vv (Nuremberg, 1615), lost
Eolo crudel come turbasti l'onde, 5vv
Qual meraviglia, 5vv
Non trovo cosa alcuna s'io non pago, 5vv

Notes

Sources
Lavern J. Wagner's article in New Grove Dictionary of Music

External links
 
 Biography at HOASM

1540s births
1590s deaths
16th-century Franco-Flemish composers